Newcastle was a constituency represented in the Irish House of Commons to 1801.

Newcastle, County Dublin was enfranchised by James I. By the late eighteenth century it had 13 electors, all non-resident. The patronage of the borough was sold by Lord Lanesborough to David La Touche in the 1770s.

Members of Parliament
1613–1615 Sir William Parsons, 1st Baronet of Bellamont and William Rolles
1634–1635 Sir John Dongan and Patrick Sherlock 
1639–1642 Sir John Dongan and Sir Henry Talbot (both expelled for non-attendance) 
1642–1646 Edmond Keating (election declared void – replaced 1643 by Arthur Whyte)
1646–1649 Henry Kenny and Cosny Molloy
1661–1666 Peter Wybrant and Francis Paisley

1689–1801

Notes

References

Constituencies of the Parliament of Ireland (pre-1801)
Historic constituencies in County Dublin
1800 disestablishments in Ireland
Constituencies disestablished in 1800
1613 establishments in Ireland